The Pacific Sociological Association (PSA) is a professional association of sociologists in the Pacific region of North America. The PSA is best known for its annual conference and academic journal Sociological Perspectives.

History
The Pacific Sociological Association was established in October 1929, when Emory S. Bogardus of the University of Southern California called together a group of area sociologists for the purpose of organizing a society. The organization was originally called the Pacific Southwest Sociological Society. In 1930, the new name, Pacific Sociological Association, was adopted. The goal of the charter members was to emerge from the isolation in which they had been at their respective institutions in order to, in union, promote sociological research and teaching. The first annual meeting was held in January 1930 in Los Angeles.

Regions
The Pacific Sociological Association currently encompasses much of the Pacific region of North America. The organization of the PSA is divided into three regions:
 Northern Region: Alaska, Alberta, British Columbia, Idaho, Montana, Oregon, Washington, and Wyoming
 Central Region: California (Fresno and northwards), Colorado, Hawaii, Nevada (excluding Las Vegas), and Utah
 Southern Region: Arizona, Baja California, California (south of Fresno), Nevada (Las Vegas only), New Mexico, Chihuahua, and Sonora

Leadership
The current executive director of the PSA is Lora Bristow.
The presidency of the organization shifts each year at its annual conference.  Recent Presidents include:  2014-15 Dr. Patricia A. Gwartney of the University of Oregon, 2015-16 Dr. Robert Nash Parker of UC Riverside, 2016-17 Dr. Karen Pyke of UC Riverside, 2017-18 Dr. Amy Orr of Linfield College, and 2018-19 Dr. Elaine Bell Kaplan of the University of Southern California.

Periodicals
 Sociological Perspectives is an academic journal published bi-monthly by the PSA.
 The Pacific Sociologist is a newsletter issued in January, May, and September by the PSA.

Awards
The Pacific Sociological Association Awards Committee grants 8 annual awards. Nominations for these awards must come from members of the PSA. 
 The Distinguished Scholarship Award
 The Dean S. Dorn Distinguished Contributions to Teaching Award
 The Early Career Award for Innovation in Teaching Sociology
 The Distinguished Praxis Award
 The Distinguished Undergraduate Student Paper Award
 The Distinguished Graduate Student Paper Award
 The Distinguished Contribution to Sociological Perspectives Award
 The Social Conscience Award

See also
American Sociological Association

References

External links
Pacific Sociological Association Website
Sociological Perspectives Academic Journal
The Pacific Sociologist Newsletter
Pacific Sociological Association - Awards Information

Sociological organizations
Professional associations based in the United States